The enzyme (4S)-limonene synthase (EC 4.2.3.16) catalyzes the chemical reaction

geranyl diphosphate  (−)-(4S)-limonene + diphosphate

This enzyme belongs to the family of lyases, specifically those carbon-oxygen lyases acting on phosphates.  The systematic name of this enzyme class is geranyl-diphosphate diphosphate-lyase [cyclizing, (−)-(4S)-limonene-forming]. Other names in common use include (−)-(4S)-limonene synthase, 4S-(−)-limonene synthase, geranyldiphosphate diphosphate lyase (limonene forming), geranyldiphosphate diphosphate lyase [cyclizing,, and (4S)-limonene-forming].  This enzyme participates in monoterpenoid biosynthesis.

References

 
 
 

EC 4.2.3
Enzymes of unknown structure